ROXi, is a television-based music entertainment experience providing full catalogue music streaming, radio, karaoke, music games, sound machine and photo visuals via a TV user interface on pay TV and Smart TV platforms and via ROXi Music System; a dedicated digital media player.

Technology 

ROXi products and services facilitate communal interaction with music, providing a shared experience for multiple users via the TV, rather than individually to phones, computers or tablets. Easton, Jonathan.“Karaoke music app ROXi lands on Sky Q in UK”, Digital TV Europe, London, 8 September 2020. Retrieved on 23 September 2020. T3 describes ROXi as "a system designed to get friends and family together round the (TV) screen and remove them from isolated behaviour, such as wearing headphones, and instead enjoying the tunage together."

ROXi Music System is a console or set top box that connects to a TV via HDMI and gets its data (the audio visual music stream) via a Wi-Fi or ethernet connection from an Internet router.[1][2] The ROXi streaming device has a Wii-style gesture-based wireless controller with a built-in microphone for voice commands and voice search and singing Karaoke. ROXi Music System plays through a TV but can connect to a soundbar, soundbase, home theatre system or any other speaker via 3.5mm auxiliary or Bluetooth. The data is output to the TV is via a HDMI connector.

Features 
Unlimited Music Streaming: ROXi is licensed by major music rights holders Sony Music Entertainment, Universal Music Group and Warner Music Group and MERLIN providing a catalogue of 55 million songs to stream on ROXi. The music catalogue is automatically updated on a weekly basis with new releases from music rights holders.

Karaoke: ROXi has 60,000 karaoke-style singalong songs. ROXi’s Sing With The Stars singalong feature provides the original artist recording along with scrolling on-screen lyrics. ROXi also features traditional Karaoke tracks without the lead vocal. ROXi Music System’s wireless controller has a built-in microphone for karaoke singalongs. T3 named ROXi one of its best karaoke gadgets when it launched in 2017.

Partnerships 

ROXi launched on Sky Q set top box in to millions of homes across the UK on 8 September 2020. This was the first time ROXi partnered with a third-party platform to make music entertainment experience available without dedicated ROXi hardware. Sky provide ROXi on Sky Q for free for 30 days followed by a monthly subscription of £6.99/month. Sky Q subscribers control ROXi using the Sky Q remote control and a ROXi iOS and Android mobile companion app.

Funding 
ROXi has raised over $15m investment with early backing from former Take That member Robbie Williams, Sheryl Crow, Alesha Dixon, Stephen Fry as well as former F1 and McLaren executive Ron Dennis. Mr Dennis owns a 10% stake in the company alongside investors such as Henrik Holmark, the former finance chief of jewelry chain Pandora, and Nigel Wray, owner of Saracens rugby club, Paul McGuinness U2 manager and TomTom co-founder Mark Gretton who also invested in the company. Pop star Kylie Minogue took a stake in the company in November 2020.

Criticism 
ROXi was criticised for announcing a planned IPO on the London Stock Exchange which would have allowed the public to buy shares, but then instead raised money privately from McLaren Group executive Ron Dennis and other investors. The reason given by ROXi at the time was that Brexit meant raising money privately was less risky and that Brexit had created turbulent market conditions.

Geographic availability

ROXi is available in:

See also 
 Comparison of on-demand streaming music services
 List of online music databases
 List of Internet radio stations
 Streaming media

 Apple Music
 Spotify
 Deezer
 Tidal
 Rhapsody
 Napster
 Pandora Radio
 IHeartRadio
 Amazon Fire TV
 Chromecast
 Roku
 Pure
 Roberts Radio

References

Android (operating system) software
Audio equipment manufacturers of the United Kingdom
British brands
Companies based in the London Borough of Islington
Digital audio distributors
Digital media players
Jukebox-style media players
Mass media companies based in London
Products introduced in 2017
Video games developed in the United Kingdom